is a railway station in the city of Hachinohe, Aomori, Japan, operated by the East Japan Railway Company (JR East).

Lines
Hon-Hachinohe Station is served by the Hachinohe Line, and lies 5.5 kilometers from the starting point of the line at Hachinohe Station.

Station layout
The station has single elevated island platform serving two tracks with the station building located underneath. The station has a Midori no Madoguchi staffed ticket office as well as automatic ticket machines.

Platforms

History
The Nippon Railway was nationalized on November 1, 1906, becoming part of the Japanese Government Railways (JGR), and a year later, on November 1, 1907, the station was renamed . The JGR became the Japanese National Railways (JNR) after World War II. In 1971,  on the Tohoku Main Line was renamed "Hachinohe Station", and the original Hachinohe Station was renamed "Hon-Hachinohe". The station building was elevated and completely rebuilt in 1977. With the privatization of JNR on April 1, 1987, it came under the operational control of JR East.

The station was again rebuilt from December 2014, with work completed on 31 July 2015.

Passenger statistics
In fiscal 2018, the station was used by an average of 1157 passengers daily (boarding passengers only).

Surrounding area
Hachinohe City Hall
Miyagi Park
Hachinohe Castle

See also
 List of railway stations in Japan

References

External links

  

Stations of East Japan Railway Company
Railway stations in Aomori Prefecture
Railway stations in Japan opened in 1898
Hachinohe Line
Hachinohe